Lydy is a surname. Notable people with the surname include:

Beth Lydy (1896–1979), American actress, operetta singer, writer, educator, and theatrical producer
Scott Lydy (born 1968), American baseball player

See also
Lidy
Lyday